Mark Towle is a car mechanic and car and motorcycle restorer and designer, best known as the owner of a car restoration and makeover shop called Gotham Garage based in Temecula, California. The shop has built props for movie studios and television shows. In 2018, Netflix released Car Masters: Rust to Riches, which features Towle and his Gotham Garage team.

Earlier in 2015, Towle became a defendant in a copyright infringement case filed and subsequently won by DC Comics regarding Towle's replication and sale of Batmobiles.

Towle's and his Gotham Garage crew's 1:1 replica of the Plymouth XNR is displayed at the Petersen Automotive Museum in Los Angeles. Other notable Gotham Garage rebuilds include the Lincoln Futura that Towle's team sold at the 2018 Grand National Roadster Show (held at the Pomona Fairplex), shown in season 1 of Car Masters: Rust to Riches.

References 

Living people
1962 births
People from Temecula, California
People from Los Angeles
American automobile designers
Vehicle modification people
Car restorers